Breath (Nafas) is a 2016 Iranian fantasy drama film directed by Narges Abyar. It was selected as the Iranian entry for the Best Foreign Language Film at the 90th Academy Awards, but it was not nominated.

Plot 
Little Bahar lives a life spun from folklore and stories, always with her head in a book. But growing up in Yazd in the 1970s and ’80s, she's at the centre of a country in turmoil: the Shah is overthrown, Ayatollah Khomeini rises to power, and the first shots are fired in a bitter and protracted war with Iraq. Over the span of several years, Bahar finds daydreaming in her own fantasy world is the only way she can make sense of the pain and suffering warring humans inflict on one another.

Awards and nominations
The Best Director award at 2016 Tallinn Black Nights Film Festival - Narges Abyar 
The Best Supporting Actress in 34th Fajr Film Festival - Shabnam Moghaddami 
Music by	Massoud Sakhavatdoost

See also
 List of submissions to the 90th Academy Awards for Best Foreign Language Film
 List of Iranian submissions for the Academy Award for Best Foreign Language Film

References

External links
 Nafas in IMDb

2016 films
2016 drama films
Iranian drama films
Persian-language films

2016 fantasy films
2010s fantasy drama films